Jennifer Mein is a British Labour Co-operative politician who was the leader of Lancashire County Council from 2013 to 2017.

Mein, who represents Preston South East, was appointed council leader in 2013, heading a Labour/Liberal coalition.

References

External links
 Lancashire County Council profile

Living people
Members of Lancashire County Council
Co-operative Party politicians
Labour Party (UK) councillors
Year of birth missing (living people)
Leaders of local authorities of England
Women councillors in England